Flashback (Gardner Monroe) is a fictional mutant character appearing in American comic books published by Marvel Comics. His first appearance was in Alpha Flight #1.

Publication history
Flashback first appeared in Alpha Flight #1 (August 1983) and was created by John Byrne. He was unidentified in his first appearance and was not named until Alpha Flight #11.

Fictional character biography
Gardner Monroe was born in Manitoba Province, Canada.  Possessing the mutant ability to summon duplicates of himself from future timelines, Monroe was recruited by Department H, a fictional branch of Canada's Department of National Defence concerned with training superhumans as government agents.  Given the code-name Flashback, Monroe progressed through the initial Gamma Flight training program and had advanced to the second-tier Beta Flight team before Department H as a whole was shut down by the Canadian government. While the primary team, Alpha Flight, continued to operate without government support, the members of Gamma and Beta Flights, including Flashback, were dismissed.

Some time later, Flashback was recruited, along with other disenfranchised members of Gamma and Beta, by Jerry Jaxon and his robot assistant Delphine Courtney into Omega Flight, a team put together to gain revenge on Department H's founder and leader of Alpha Flight, James MacDonald Hudson.  Though Omega Flight was defeated, the encounter ended with Guardian's apparent death.

During Alpha Flight's second encounter with Omega Flight, one of Flashback's duplicates was killed by a construct created by Madison Jeffries after Courtney used it as a shield against the construct's attack, causing all other duplicates present to vanish. Upon the realization that his duplicate's death would mean his death in the future, Flashback fell to his knees in shock while Jeffries dealt with the remaining Omegans and destroyed Courtney. Flashback and his teammates were left under guard by Jeffries' construct until the police arrived to apprehend them.

Some years later Alpha Flight was informed that Flashback had disappeared from prison, and was presumed dead.  Years later, Flashback resurfaced, and tried to redeem himself by destroying his costume, reasoning that if he didn't have his costume he couldn't be sent back to his death.

Then one morning Flashback woke up to discover his costume hanging in the bathroom. This version however had the same design as the ones worn by his duplicates. Flashback soon discovered that no matter what he did, he kept on finding himself in the duplicate suit.

In desperation, Flashback contacted Sasquatch and his Alpha Flight team and convinced them to help him. The Alpha Flight member Nemesis came to the conclusion that she would have to kill him with her enchanted blade in order to stop him from dying in the future. After much trial and error Alpha Flight managed to keep Flashback from being sent to the past.

Powers and abilities
Flashback is a mutant with the psionic ability to cause temporal counterparts of himself from alternate future timelines to appear in the present and to control them. Each duplicate appears in a reverse-color version of the original Flashback's costume. These counterparts vanish whenever Flashback is rendered unconscious; lacking any apparent skill in combat or tactics (relying solely on his advantage in numbers), this makes Flashback a comparatively easy foe to defeat, as he tends to stand back from actual combat and focus solely on the activities of his duplicates, to the exclusion of all else.

Other versions

Age of Apocalypse
In the Age of Apocalypse, Flashback was targeted by Apocalypse's purge of chrono-variant mutants. His fate is unknown, as Apocalypse's databases listed him as missing in action.

House of M
In the House of M reality, Flashback assisted in breaking Baron Strucker out of prison.

References

External links
 
 AlphaFlight.Net Alphanex Entry on - Flashback
 UncannXmen.net Character Profile on Flashback

Fictional characters who can duplicate themselves
Marvel Comics mutants